Jeff Stuart may refer to:

Jeff Stuart (screenwriter) of The Trance (The Twilight Zone)
Jeff Stuart, character in Racing Luck (1948 film)

See also
Jeff Stewart (disambiguation)